Gustavo Lemos Petta (born December 26, 1980 in Campinas) is a Brazilian politician and former president of Brazil's National Union of Students (União Nacional dos Estudantes) from 2003 to 2007.

References 

1980 births
People from Campinas
Brazilian communists
Communist Party of Brazil politicians
Living people